Pierini is a tribe of butterflies within the family Pieridae.

Genera
Listed alphabetically:
Aoa de Nicéville, 1898
Aporia Hübner, [1819] – blackveins
Appias Hübner, [1819] – puffins and albatrosses
Archonias Hübner, 1825
Ascia Scopoli, 1777
Baltia Moore, 1878
Belenois Hübner, [1819] – caper whites
Catasticta Butler, 1870
Cepora Billberg, 1820 – gulls
Charonias Röber, [1908]
Delias Hübner, [1819] – Jezebels
Dixeia Talbot, 1932
Eucheira Westwood, 1834
Ganyra Billberg, 1820
Glennia Klots, 1933
Glutophrissa Butler, 1887
Hypsochila Ureta, 1955
Infraphulia Field, 1958
Itaballia Kaye, 1904
Ixias Hübner, [1819] – Indian orange tips
Leodonta Butler, 1870
Leptophobia Butler, 1870
Leuciacria Rothschild & Jordan, 1905
Melete Swainson, [1831]
Mesapia Gray, 1856
Mylothris Hübner, [1819] – dotted borders
Neophasia Behr, 1869
Pereute Herrich-Schäffer, 1867
Perrhybris Hübner, [1819]
Phrissura Butler, 1870
Phulia Herrich-Schäffer, 1867
Piercolias Grote, 1903
Pieriballia Klots, 1933
Pieris Schrank, 1801 – whites
Pierphulia Field, 1958
Pinacopteryx Wallengren, 1857
Pontia Fabricius, 1807
Prioneris Wallace, 1867 – sawtooths
Pseudomylothris Neustetter, 1929
Reliquia Ackery, 1975
Saletara Distant, 1885
Sinopieris Huang, 1995
Tatochila Butler, 1870
Theochila Field, 1958

References

 
Pierinae
Butterfly tribes